The Tillman House is a historic house in Natchez, Mississippi, USA.

History
The Tillman House was built from 1834 to 1837 by Joseph Neibert and Peter Gemmell. In 1837, it was purchased by Lemuel P. Rooks. Roughly a decade later, in 1845, it was purchased by Dr. Charles H. Dubs, a dentist from Philadelphia. In the midst of the American Civil War, in 1862, the house was purchased by Joseph Tillman and his wife Ricca, a Jewish couple who had come to Natchez in 1843. It was subsequently inherited by their son, Cassius L. Tillman, Sr., who served as the treasurer of Adams County.

Architectural significance
It has been listed on the National Register of Historic Places since April 17, 1979.

References

Houses on the National Register of Historic Places in Mississippi
Houses completed in 1836
Houses in Adams County, Mississippi
1836 establishments in Mississippi